The 2007 Chennai Open Singles contest was an ATP Tour tennis tournament event held in Chennai, India from 1 January until 8 January 2007.

Xavier Malisse defeated Stefan Koubek 6–1, 6–3 to win the 2007 Chennai Open singles event.

Seeds

Draw

Finals

Section 1

Section 2

External links
Association of Tennis Professionals (ATP) draw
Qualifying draw

Singles
Maharashtra Open